Acheiria  is the congenital absence of one or both hands.

Causes 
It can occur in a number of situations which include:
 Amniotic band syndrome, particularly if unilateral
Cornelia de Lange syndrome
 Fetal hydantoin syndrome
 Incontinentia pigmenti

References 

Congenital amputations